Iospilidae is a family of polychaetes belonging to the order Phyllodocida.

Genera:
 Iospilopsis Augener, 1922
 Iospilus Viguier, 1886
 Paraiospilus Viguier, 1911
 Phalacrophorus Greeff, 1879

References

Polychaetes